Roosevelt Barnes, Jr. (born August 3, 1958) is a former football linebacker for the Detroit Lions of the National Football League and a current sports agent. He played three sports at Purdue University—football, basketball, and baseball. While he was most noted as a football player, he also enjoyed significant success in basketball, playing on Purdue's 1980 Final Four team. After retiring from professional football, in 1987 Barnes became a partner and contract advisor with Maximum Sports Management. He has negotiated contracts for Laveranues Coles, Walter Jones, Ray Lewis, Ndamukong Suh, Roman Oben, and Andre Wadsworth among others.

High school
Barnes attended Wayne High School in Fort Wayne.  As a junior, he led his team to the SAC conference title, and the Generals also won their first sectional championship.  As a senior, the team repeated, winning the school's second sectional title.

As reported in the Wayne Generals 2009–10 Winter Athletic Program, Barnes' high-school career resulted in the following awards and Wayne High School accomplishments:
Boys' Basketball Individual Records:
most career points scored (1304 points)
highest career scoring average (18.6ppg)
2nd best career assists record (439 assists)
2nd best single-season scoring record (509 points, 1975/76)
3rd best single-season assists record (212 assists, 1975/76)
Boys' Basketball Team Records:
best single-season team record (20–3, .870, 1976/77)
2nd best single-season team record (20–6, .769, 1975/76)
highest single-season team offensive average (72.9ppg, 1976/77)
Awards Received:
3-time basketball All-SAC selection (1974/75, 1975/76, 1976/77)
Indiana basketball All-Star team selection (1976/77)

College
After his success in high school, Barnes attended Purdue University on a basketball scholarship.  At Purdue, Barnes demonstrated his athletic diversity by playing on the varsity basketball (4 years), football (1 year) and baseball (1 year) teams.  After Purdue, Barnes continued his football career as a 10th round draft pick of the Detroit Lions.

Personal life
Barnes has four children in all—three biological and one adopted. The adopted son, Caleb Swanigan (1997-2022), was a 1st-round NBA draft pick (26th overall) for the Portland Trail Blazers, and played basketball at Purdue. Barnes also serves as an AAU basketball coach.

References

1958 births
Living people
American football linebackers
American sports agents
Basketball players from Fort Wayne, Indiana
Players of American football from Fort Wayne, Indiana
Detroit Lions players
Fort Wayne Fury players
Purdue Boilermakers football players
Purdue Boilermakers men's basketball players
Purdue Boilermakers baseball players
American men's basketball players